The .50 Alaskan is a wildcat cartridge developed by Harold Johnson and Harold Fuller of the Kenai Peninsula of Alaska in the 1950s. Johnson based the cartridge on the .348 Winchester in order to create a rifle capable of handling the large bears in Alaska.

Design
Harold Johnson necked out the .348 Winchester case to accept a .510" diameter bullet, and Harold Fuller developed the barrel, marrying a .50 caliber barrel to an old Winchester Model 1886 rifle.

Harold Johnson made the first 450 Alaskan in 1952, and continued to make them in the 1950s and 60s. The rifle was based on the Winchester Model 71 in .348 caliber. Bill Fuller made the reamers. John Buhmiller made the barrel. Frank Barnes made the bullets. The "50" came later.

Since the rifle was designed for use on Alaska’s great bears, Johnson cut  boat-tail .50 BMG bullets in half, seating the  rear half upside down in the fireformed .50-caliber case. It didn’t take Johnson long to find out that the truncated-shaped "solid" would shoot through a big brown bear from any direction, claiming in 1988, "I never recovered a slug from a bear or moose, no matter what angle the animal was shot at."

Performance

The Alaskan is shorter than the .510 Kodiak Express and produces about 10% less energy or 33% less energy than the 50-110, out of a 71 Winchester re-barreled to chamber the 50-110 WCF 6,000 foot-pounds.

Availability
Rifles for .50 BMF Bullet are available from some specialty gunsmiths and also conversions from Marlin and Winchester lever-action rifles.
Reloading dies are available from Hornady. Brass is available from Starline Brass.  Although it is considered a wildcat cartridge, loaded ammunition is available from Buffalo Bore.

See also
 Thumper concept
 List of rifle cartridges
 .458 SOCOM
 .450 Bushmaster
 .50 Beowulf
 12.7×55mm STs-130

References

External links

Pistol and rifle cartridges
Wildcat cartridges